Meet Your Navy was a wartime radio programme broadcast Saturday nights on the Blue Network, originating from the U.S. Naval Training Center in Lake County, Illinois via WLS (AM).  It was a half-hour show, which featured a cast of 275 naval personnel, of which 200 members formed a choir, and the rest formed an orchestra, and supplied soloists, actors and announcers.

Meet Your Navy
North Chicago, Illinois
Mass media in Illinois